Daukšai (formerly ) is a village in Kėdainiai district municipality, in Kaunas County, in central Lithuania. According to the 2011 census, the village was uninhabited.

It was an estate of the Zaleski family at the beginning of the 20th century.

Demography

References

Villages in Kaunas County
Kėdainiai District Municipality